Monforte de Lemos Railway Station  is the main railway station of Monforte de Lemos in Galicia, Spain.

Services

References

Railway stations in Galicia (Spain)
Buildings and structures in the Province of Lugo
Monforte de Lemos